Mueang Sing is a historical park in Sai Yok District, Kanchanaburi Province, Thailand. It protects the remains of two Khmer temples dating to the 13th and 14th centuries. It was declared a historical park in 1987.

History 
The history of the site goes back to the period between 857 and 1157, a period when the Khmer Kingdom was flourishing. Records show that the town was abandoned until the reign of King Rama I.  The name Mueang Sing first showed in the chronicles of the reign of King Rama I (1782-1809), when it was a fortified town protecting the town Kanchanaburi. In the reform of provincial administration at the end of the 19th century its status was reduced from Mueang to Tambon (commune).

Architecture 
Built in the Bayon-style, the temples date to the Khmer kingdom in the reign of King Jayavarman VII (1180 to 1219). A stone inscription of Prince Vira Kumara praising his father, 23 cities are named. One of these cities was named Srichaiya Singhapura, which some scholars identify with Mueang Sing.

Four monuments are located inside the area of 736,000 m² enclosed by a laterite wall. The south wall winds along the Khwae Noi river course, while the other three sides are quadratic. The main monument is in the center of the area. Northwest of this are the foundations of a second temple building. The other two monuments are of much smaller scale.

References

Historical parks of Thailand
Angkorian sites in Thailand
Geography of Kanchanaburi province
Tourist attractions in Kanchanaburi province
Buildings and structures in Kanchanaburi province

km:ប្រាសាទមឿងសិង្ហ